Andrea Degortes, known as Aceto (born May 1, 1943 in Olbia, Italy), is a retired Italian Palio jockey, and the modern-day record holder for greatest number of wins in the Palio di Siena with 14 victories between 1965 and 1992.

Palio Victories

 2 July 1965 - winning for Contrade Dell' Aquila
 16 August 1968 - winning for Contrade Dell' Oca
 21 September 1969 - winning for Contrade Dell' Oca
 2 July 1972 - winning for Contrade Della Tartuca
 17 September 1972 - winning for Contrade Dell' Istrice
 16 August 1974 - winning for Contrade Della Selva
 16 August 1975 - winning for Contrade Della Chioccciola
 16 August 1976 - winning for Contrade Della Civetta
 16 August 1977 - winning for Contrade Dell' Oca
 16 August 1979 - winning for Contrade Dell' Aquila
 16 August 1980 - winning for Contrade Della Leocorno
 2 July 1984 - winning for Contrade Dell' Oca
 2 July 1985 - winning for Contrade Dell' Oca
 3 July 1992 - winning for Contrade Dell' Aquila

References

Italian jockeys
People from Olbia
1943 births
Living people
Sportspeople from Sardinia